Gonzalo Pizarro Canton is a canton of Ecuador, located in the Sucumbíos Province.  Its capital is the town of Lumbaqui.  Its population at the 2001 census was 6,964.

References

Cantons of Sucumbíos Province